Sergey Mudrov (born 8 September 1990) is a Russian high jumper.

Biography
As a teenager he won the silver medal at the 2007 World Youth Championships, finished fourth at the 2008 World Junior Championships and the gold medal at the 2009 European Junior Championships.

He later competed at the 2011 European Indoor Championships without reaching the final, won the silver medal at the 2011 European U23 Championships and the bronze medal at the 2011 Universiade. His personal best jump was 2.30 metres, achieved in July 2011 in Ostrava. He has achieved 2.31 metres outdoors, a mark set in April 2011 in Des Moines.

In 2013, he won the gold medal at the 2013 European Athletics Indoor Championships, jumping a new personal best of 2.35 metres and beating compatriot Aleksey Dmitrik.

Achievements

References

External links
 

1990 births
Living people
Russian male high jumpers
Universiade medalists in athletics (track and field)
Universiade gold medalists for Russia
Universiade bronze medalists for Russia
Medalists at the 2011 Summer Universiade
Medalists at the 2013 Summer Universiade